The Enemy Within is a Greek film, directed by Yorgos Tsemberopoulos. The film released in 2013 and it stars Manolis Mavromatakis and Maria Zorba. Tsemberopoulos has described the film as a social drama that "deals with whether morally conscious people can stick to their principles in the very difficult times we live in."

The film premiered at the 2013 Athens International Film Festival. It won three awards in Hellenic Film Academy Awards in categories Best Director, Best Screenplay and Best Editing.

Plot
A progressive and open-minded man, owner of a flower shop, lives in Athens with his family, his wife and two teenage children. His serene and ordinary life turns over when some burglars, invade in his house. After this event, his perception and his ideas change. He feels unsafe, fear but mostly rage. His anger drives him to find the burglars in order to revenge them. But this act destroys the family calmness and he starts to live under the fear.

Cast
Manolis Mavromatakis 	
Maria Zorba 
Yiorgos Gallos 
Antonis Karistinos
Thanasis Papageorgiou

Awards

References

External links

Greek crime drama films
2013 films